The Ophryocystidae are a family of parasites in the phylum Apicomplexa. Species in this family infect insects (Coleoptera and Lepidoptera).

History

This family was created by Léger and Duboscq in 1908.

Taxonomy

One genus is placed in this family - Ophryocystis - with at least 10 species.  This is the type family of the order Neogregarinorida.

Lifecycle

Most species in this family infect the Malpighian tubes of beetles.

The trophozoite is conical in shape.

Two types of schizogony occur in this family. In the first type the schizonts divide into merozoites with small nuclei. These are known as mycetoids merozoites. These develop into trophozoites. In the second form and more common form, the schizonts divide into merozoites with large nuclei: these are known as gregarinoid merozoites and give rise to gametocytes.

The merozoites are uninucleated, pyriform cells. These are released into the lumen of the tube and from there infect other cells of the tube.

The gametocytes possesses only a single nucleus and are globular in shape. When mature, these become detached from the epithelium. Within the lumen, the gametocytes associate in pairs, fuse and form a zygote.

The zygote subsequently becomes a single octozoic spore.

References

Conoidasida
Apicomplexa families
Parasites of insects